Ellen Taylor Marlow is an American actress. She is best known for her roles as Claire Lyons in The Clique movie based on the books by Lisi Harrison.

Life
Ellen Taylor Marlow was born in Dallas, Texas.  She moved to Austin, Texas at age 3 and became active in sports and cheerleading.  Her love of performance and musical theatre in particular began during a family vacation to New York City at age 4.

Marlow's early education was in the Texas school system, but after beginning her formal acting career in Chitty, she alternated between private tutoring and the Burbank, California public school system as her acting career allowed until she formally signed with Quality Education by Design (QED), a homeschool educational consultancy.

Ellen's first love is music and she appreciates a wide range of styles from hip-hop and hard rock to Broadway show tunes.  Ellen enjoys collaborating with her older brother J.R. who is an accomplished musician, composer and choreographer.  In her spare time, Ellen loves to travel and often returns to her home state of Texas to visit family and friends.

She now lives in the Los Angeles area, but frequently returns to New York City for various projects.

Career
Ellen Marlow portrayed the role of Claire Lyons in the Warner Premiere movie The Clique based on the New York Times' best selling 
book by Lisi Harrison that was released in fall of 2008.

Ellen originated the lead role of Jemima Potts in the Broadway production of the Tony-nominated musical "Chitty Chitty Bang Bang" (directed by Adrian Noble and co-starring Raúl Esparza and Philip Bosco). In dream-come-true fashion, she was chosen for the coveted role from among 3000 young hopefuls at an open casting call and, at the age of ten, moved to 
New York City, where she would also appear as Katarina in director Des McAnuff’s NY staged reading of the musical Zhivago.

Prior to Broadway, the Texas native was seen in regional theatre productions of Grease (as Sandy), Joseph and The Amazing Technicolor Dreamcoat and The Wizard of Oz.

In addition to making numerous public singing appearances in support of Chitty (including The Today Show), Ellen has performed the National Anthem at various sporting events in Texas and New York. On film, she played the young Fiona in Quid Pro Quo (directed by Carlos Brooks, starring Nick Stahl, Kate Burton and Vera Farmiga), which debuted to acclaim at the 2008 Sundance Film Festival.

Marlow continues to develop her career in film, television, theater, and music. She has appeared in the Jerry Bruckheimer produced ABC pilot for The Forgotten starring Christian Slater as well as episodes of Cold Case, CSI: Crime Scene Investigation and Criminal Minds.

Filmography

Film

Television

References

External links
Ellen Marlow's Official Website

1994 births
Living people
People from Dallas
American child actresses
American film actresses
American musical theatre actresses
American television actresses
Actresses from Texas
21st-century American actresses